The Women's Slalom in the 2022 FIS Alpine Skiing World Cup consisted of 9 events, including the final.

2020 discipline champion Petra Vlhová of Slovakia jumped out to the early lead in the discipline standings and was able to separate from her closest competitor, six-time champion Mikaela Shiffrin of the United States, when Shiffrin had to miss time at the end of December due to contracting the COVID-19 virus. Vlhová won five of the first six slaloms during the season and finished second in the other.  Although Shiffrin won the next race on 11 January in Schladming and set a career record for World Cup victories in any discipline with her 47th slalom victory, Vlhová finished second and, with a 220-point lead and just two more races scheduled on the slalom calendar for 2021-22, she clinched the season crystal globe in slalom over two months before the end of the season.

As noted above, the season was interrupted by the 2022 Winter Olympics in Beijing, China (at the Yanqing National Alpine Skiing Centre in Yanqing District) from 6–19 February 2022.  Although the Alpine Skiing branch of the International Ski Federation (FIS) conducts the World Cup and co-organizes the Alpine skiing at the Winter Olympics (along with the International Olympic Committee {IOC)), the Winter Olympics are organized by nation (a maximum of four skiers is permitted per nation), and (after 1968) the Olympic results do not count for World Cup points. Accordingly, the results in the Olympics are highlighted in blue and shown in this table by ordinal position only in each discipline.  The women's slalom was held at the "Ice River" course on 9 February 2022.

The World Cup final was held on Saturday, 19 March in the linked resorts of Courchevel and Méribel, France, which are located in Les Trois Vallées, on the Roc de Fer course at Méribel. Only the top 25 skiers in the World Cup giant slalom discipline and the winner of the Junior World Championship, plus athletes who have scored at least 500 points in the World Cup overall classification for the season, are eligible to compete in the final, and only the top 15 earn World Cup points. 2022 World Junior champion Zrinka Ljutić of Croatia surprisingly finished fifth in the final.

Standings

Legend

DNQ = Did Not Qualify for run 2
DNF1 = Did Not Finish run 1
DSQ1 = Disqualified run 1
DNF2 = Did Not Finish run 2
DSQ2 = Disqualified run 2
DNS2 = Did Not Start run 2

See also
 2022 Alpine Skiing World Cup – Women's summary rankings
 2022 Alpine Skiing World Cup – Women's Overall
 2022 Alpine Skiing World Cup – Women's Downhill
 2022 Alpine Skiing World Cup – Women's Super-G
 2022 Alpine Skiing World Cup – Women's Giant Slalom
 2022 Alpine Skiing World Cup – Women's Parallel
 World Cup scoring system

References

External links
 Alpine Skiing at FIS website

Women's slalom
FIS Alpine Ski World Cup slalom women's discipline titles